Alice Hayes may refer to:

Alice Hayes (Quaker)  (1657–1720), English preacher and autobiographer
Alice M. Hayes (1862/63–1913), British horse trainer
 Alice Hayes, a fictional supervillain in the Pride team of Marvel Comics